Yukon is a census-designated place located in South Huntingdon Township, Westmoreland County in the state of Pennsylvania, United States.  The community is located near Interstate 70, north of the village of Wyano.  As of the 2010 census the population was 677 residents.

Labor history
Yukon was the epicenter of the Slovak Strike of 1910-1911.  On May 8, 1911 Westmoreland County Sheriff Deputies fired into a crowd of labor protesters.

References

Census-designated places in Westmoreland County, Pennsylvania
Census-designated places in Pennsylvania